State Route 144 (SR-144) is a state highway in the U.S. state of Utah. Spanning , it connects Tibble Fork Reservoir with American Fork Canyon.

Route description

History
The route was transferred from the Forest Service and designated a state highway in 1978, after the road was classified as a local road and there was interest in placing the road under state administration.

Major intersections

References

External links

 

144
 144